The Gift is an album by multi-instrumentalist Charles Moffett. It was recorded during 1969 in New York City, and was released the same year by Savoy Records. On the album, Moffett appears on drums, trumpet, and vibraphone, and is joined by saxophonist Paul Jeffrey, bassist Wilbur Ware, and drummer Dennis O'Toole.

Moffett's son Codaryl, seven years old at the time of the recording, and now a recording artist, also appears on drums, and is credited for composing and titling the track "Avant Garde Got Soul Too." Concerning the tune's title, writer and radio host David Mittleman stated that it is "an attitude that says the traditional barriers between seemingly incompatible genres are a myth; everything is possible."

Reception

In a review for AllMusic, Scott Yanow wrote: "The songtitle 'Avant Garde Got Soul Too' pretty well sums up this adventurous but often surprisingly melodic set."

Track listing
Track timings not provided.

 "Avant Garde Got Soul Too"
 "Adverb"
 "The Gift"
 "Blues Strikes Again"
 "Yelricks"

Personnel 
 Charles Moffett – drums, trumpet, vibraphone
 Paul Jeffrey – tenor saxophone
 Wilbur Ware – bass
 Dennis O'Toole – drums
 Codaryl Moffett – drums

References

1969 albums
Savoy Records albums